Terrington St Clement is a village and civil parish in King's Lynn and West Norfolk borough and district in Norfolk, England.

Much of the farmland is of alluvial silt and clay which has been reclaimed from the sea amounting to approximately half of the total parish area.

Terrington St Clement in area is the largest village in Norfolk, and the second largest in the country.

History
The name Terrington derives from the Old English for 'Farm/settlement of Tir(a)'s people' as -ingtūn means a settlement called after, or connected with... . 

In AD 1013 Godric, son of Æthelstan Mannessune gifted part of the lands of Turrintonea to the monks of Ramsey Abbey in his will where his brother, Eadnoth the Younger had been abbott. This is recorded in the S1518 Charter.

The settlement, along with Terrington St John, is referred to in the Domesday Book as Tilinghetuna where the population is recorded as 25 households made up of 12 villagers, 11 smallholders, 1 freeman, and 1 slave in 1086. Other resources recorded in 1086 included 515 sheep, 14 pigs, 11 cattle, and 1 cob with 48 acres of meadow and 12.5 salthouses. Before the Norman conquest of England the lands were held by Thorth, son of Ulfkil and Thorkil with them being transferred to Henry de Ferrers and Ralph Barnard by 1086.  

By the medieval period the small settlement which began on raised ground on the edge of the marsh had grown substantially. A parish church, dedicated to St Clement (Pope Clement I), known as the "Cathedral of the Marshland", was built in the 14th century by Edmund Gonville, Rector of Terrington, who founded Gonville Hall (now Gonville and Caius College) at Cambridge University.

John Colton (died 1404), Lord Chancellor of Ireland and Archbishop of Armagh, was born in the village.

Methodists were established in the village in 1813. During the Victorian era a Wesleyan Methodist chapel, a Primitive Methodist chapel, a Salvation Army headquarters and three other mission chapels were established.

The area has been the subject of some historical research by local residents, while archaeological investigation has included field walking during the Fenland Survey, although this largely excluded the area around the present settlement. Archaeological test pits were dug between 2005 and 2009; the report was published online.

Terrington railway station once served the settlement.

Community facilities
Terrington St Clement facilities include two doctor's surgeries, a post office, a village hall and a scout hut. Commercial amenities include a supermarket, a farm shop, a newsagent's, a baker's, a fish & chip shop, a Chinese takeaway, a hairdresser's, an estate agent, and a hardware store; there are two public houses, the King William and the Wildfowler.

The village is linked to King's Lynn, Spalding, and Wisbech by bus services.

Education
Terrington St Clement has state run primary and secondary schools. St Clement's High School was the centre of some press attention, firstly when its previous head, Richard Wealthall, was singled out for praise and a visit from Prime Minister Tony Blair, and again subsequently when he was found to have been guilty of bullying and nepotism.

The school was placed into special measures in 2007 by Ofsted. A following 2011 Ofsted report gave the school an overall Grade 2 'Good' rating. The school obtained another 'Good' rating from Ofsted in 2017.

Notable people
 

Keith Rudd (born 1946), former cricketer

References

External links

 Terrington St Clement Community Website
 Terrington St Clement Parish Church Website

 
Villages in Norfolk
Civil parishes in Norfolk
King's Lynn and West Norfolk